The Enid Terminal Grain Elevators Historic District is located in Enid, Garfield County, Oklahoma and listed on the National Register of Historic Places since 2009. The district consists of concrete grain elevators located between North 10th, North 16th, North Van Buren, and Willow Streets which have dotted the Enid skyline since the 1920s.

History

In 1938, during the Great Depression, Enid set a record of 14,185 train loads of wheat. By April 1939, Enid was claiming the title of "Oklahoma’s Queen Wheat City." By 1962, Garfield County's storage capacity was 75 million bushels, becoming the state of Oklahoma's main grain storage and handling center. By 1970, the city claimed the title of Wheat Capital of the United States of America.

The need for grain transportation has led to the continued improvement of Enid's infrastructure. In addition to being a grain storage hub, Enid was a rail hub for the Cherokee Outlet. The first elevator built in Enid, the Enid Terminal Elevator, is located next to the Van Buren overpass next to Enid's main rail hub, five of the elevators are on the St. Louis and San Francisco Railroad tracks or connecting lines in the north part of town, and U.S. Highway 64 runs in an east–west direction just to the south of Elevators Y and Z.

Enid hit its peak with a total grain storage capacity of 80,000,000 bushels in 1987. The 1980 grain embargo instated by President Jimmy Carter, a poor economy, and drought lead to the closure of several of the elevators. In 1989, the Union Equity Co-Operative Exchange Elevators A and B and the Oklahoma Wheat Pool Terminal Elevator were shut down. Enid continues to have the largest grain storage capacity in the United States and the third largest in the world.

List of Grain Elevators

References

Tourist attractions in Enid, Oklahoma
Agricultural buildings and structures on the National Register of Historic Places in Oklahoma
Buildings and structures in Enid, Oklahoma
Geography of Garfield County, Oklahoma
Agricultural buildings and structures on the National Register of Historic Places
Grain elevators in Oklahoma
Historic districts on the National Register of Historic Places in Oklahoma
National Register of Historic Places in Garfield County, Oklahoma